The Steiner–Lobman and Teague Hardware Buildings are historic buildings in Montgomery, Alabama, U.S.. They were built by businessmen Louis Steiner and Nathan Lobman circa 1891 for their dry goods store. By 1895, the Southern building was sold to William Martin Teague, the owner of the Teague Hardware Company. The buildings remained in the respective families as late as the 1970s. They have been listed on the National Register of Historic Places since January 31, 1979.

References

National Register of Historic Places in Alabama
Italianate architecture in Alabama
Buildings and structures completed in 1891
Buildings and structures in Montgomery, Alabama